Vietnam participated in the 2010 Asian Beach Games in Muscat, Oman on 8–16 December 2010.
The Vietnamese team comprises 73 athletes competing in 7 sports: Beach handball, Beach sepaktakraw, Beach soccer, Beach volleyball, Bodybuilding, Marathon swimming, Woodball.

Competitors

Medal summary

Medals table

Medalists 

Nations at the 2010 Asian Beach Games
2010
Asian Beach Games